Sebastian Leitner (1919 in Salzburg – 1989) was a German commentator and science popularizer.

As a student in Vienna, he was briefly kept in custody by the Nazis in 1938 because of his opposition to the annexation of Austria into Greater Germany. Later he moved to Frankfurt to study law, but he was recruited by the Wehrmacht in 1942. After spending several years in a Soviet POW camp, he returned to Germany in 1949 and started a career as a commentator. His wife was the Austrian journalist and author Thea Leitner.

At first, he focused on legal and sociological topics, but later he took medical and psychology-related subjects as his theme. His book So lernt man lernen (How to learn to learn), a practical manual on the psychology of learning, became a bestseller. In this often-cited book he described his Leitner System which uses flashcards for accelerated and increased learning by spaced repetition .

Books 

1919 births
1989 deaths
20th-century psychologists
German psychologists
Austrian emigrants to Germany